Worthington is a surname, and may refer to:

Persons:
 Al Worthington (born 1929), American baseball player
 Andy Worthington, British historian, investigative journalist and film director
 Arthur Mason Worthington (1852–1916), English physicist
 Arthur Norreys Worthington (1862–1912), Canadian physician, surgeon, soldier and politician
 Arthur Worthington (before 1890–1917), American-born Australasian alternative religious leader, bigamist and fraudster
 E. Barton Worthington (1905–2001), British ecologist and science administrator
 Bob Worthington (1936–2008), Honorary Consul of the Cook Islands to the United States
 Bob Worthington (footballer) (born 1947), English professional footballer
 Bryony Worthington, Baroness Worthington (born 1971), British environmental campaigner and Labour life peer
 Cal Worthington (1920–2013), American car dealer
 Charles Campbell Worthington (1854–1944), American industrialist and golf enthusiast
 Christa Worthington (1956–2002), American fashion writer
 Craig Worthington (born 1965), American baseball player
 Dave Worthington (born 1945), English footballer with Grimsby Town, brother of Frank
 Denison Worthington (1806–1880), American politician (Wisconsin)
 Doug Worthington (born 1987), American football defensive end
 Edward Worthington, American pioneer and soldier
 Everett Worthington (born before 1968), American psychologist
 Elizabeth Strong Worthington (1851–1916), American writer
 Eric Worthington (1925–2006), English academic, professional footballer and football coach
 F. F. Worthington (1889–1967), Canadian Major-General
 Frank Worthington (1948–2021), English footballer, brother of Dave
 Fred Worthington (disambiguation), multiple people
 Gary Worthington (born 1966), English professional footballer
 George Worthington (disambiguation), multiple people
 Greg Worthington (born 1990), rugby league footballer
 Harry Worthington (1891–1990), American track and field athlete
 Henry G. Worthington (1828–1909), American politician and ambassador
 Henry Rossiter Worthington (1817–1880), American engineer
 Hugh Worthington (1752–1813), British Arian divine
 Hubert Worthington (1886–1963), English architect
 Jack Worthington (born 1961), American investment banker
 John Worthington (disambiguation), multiple people
 Jon Worthington (born 1983), English footballer
 Kay Worthington (born 1959), Canadian Olympic champion rower
 Kevin Worthington (born 1953), Australian rules footballer
 Laming Worthington-Evans (1868–1931), British politician
 Marjorie Muir Worthington (1900–1976), American writer
 Mark Worthington (journalist) (born 1977), British broadcaster and businessman
 Mark Worthington (born 1983), Australian professional basketball player
 Martin Worthington (born 1981), English rugby player and professional footballer
 Nicholas E. Worthington (1836–1916), U.S. Representative from Illinois
 Nigel Worthington (born 1961), Northern Irish former footballer and manager
 Paul Clayton Worthington (1931–1967), American folk singer Paul Clayton
 Percy Worthington (1864–1939), English architect
 Jack Gordon (Peter Worthington) (1822–1864), American renegade and outlaw
 Peter Worthington (1927–2013), Canadian journalist
 Peter Worthington (cricketer) (born 1979), Australian cricketer
 Red Worthington (1906–1963), American baseball player
 Sam Worthington (born 1976), Australian actor
 Sarah Worthington (born 1955), British legal scholar
 Stan Worthington (1905–1973), English cricketer
 Thomas Worthington (disambiguation), multiple people
 Tony Worthington (born 1941), British politician
 Walter Brooke Cox Worthington (1795–1845), American politician (Maryland)
 William Worthington (disambiguation), multiple people
 Wilmer Worthington (1804–1873), American politician and physician

Fictional characters:
 Felicity Worthington, one of the main characters in Libba Bray's novels
 Warren Worthington III, Marvel comics anti-hero
 Johnny J. Worthington III, president of the fictional fraternity Roar Omega Roar and a character in the 2013 Pixar film Monsters University.

See also 
 Worthington family - historic family with significant roles in British peerage
 Worthington (disambiguation), for places by this name

English-language surnames